is a former Japanese football player. She played for Japan national team.

Club career
Ogawa played for Iga FC Kunoichi.

National team career
On December 17, 2000, Ogawa debuted for Japan national team against United States.

National team statistics

References

1980 births
Living people
Japanese women's footballers
Japan women's international footballers
Nadeshiko League players
Iga FC Kunoichi players
Women's association football forwards